Thin small outline package (TSOP) is a type of surface mount IC package. They are very low-profile (about 1mm) and have tight lead spacing (as low as 0.5mm).

They are frequently used for RAM or Flash memory ICs due to their high pin count and small volume.  In some applications, they are being supplanted by ball grid array packages which can achieve even higher densities. The prime application for this technology is memory. SRAM, flash memory, FSRAM and E2PROM manufacturers find this package well suited to their end-use products. It answers the needs required by telecom, cellular, memory modules, PC cards (PCMCIA cards), wireless, netbooks and countless other product applications.

TSOP is the smallest leaded form factor for flash memory.

History 

The TSOP package was developed to fit the reduced package height available in a PCMCIA PC Card.

Physical properties

TSOPs are rectangular in shape and come in two varieties: Type I and Type II. Type I ICs have the pins on the shorter side and Type II have the pins on the longer side. The table below shows basic measurements for common TSOP packages.

Type I

Type II

HTSOP 
The HTSOP is a TSOP with an exposed pad on the bottom side. The exposed pad will be soldered on the pcb to transfer heat from the package to the pcb.

Similar packages
There are a variety of small form-factor IC carrier available other than TSOPs
 Small-outline integrated circuit (SOIC)
 Plastic small-outline package (PSOP)
 Shrink small-outline package (SSOP)
 Thin-shrink small outline package (TSSOP)

See also
 Integrated circuit
 Chip carrier Chip packaging and package types list

References

External links

 TSOP Package Information from Amkor Technology

Chip carriers